Laver may refer to:

 Laver (surname), a list of people with the name
 Laver (ghost town), Sweden
 Green laver, a type of edible green seaweed used to make laverbread
 River Laver, a river in North Yorkshire, England
 Lavatorium, a washing facility in a monastery
 A basin for ritual purification
 Laver Bariu (1929–2014), Albanian folk clarinetist and singer

See also 
 Leaver, a surname
 Lever (disambiguation)